Gilbert Evenom Ngolo (born August 17, 1957) is a Malagasy politician. He is a member of the Senate of Madagascar for Menabe, and is a member of the Tiako I Madagasikara party.

References
Africa Intelligence article
Newsmada article

1957 births
Living people
Members of the Senate (Madagascar)
Place of birth missing (living people)
Tiako I Madagasikara politicians